The House of Three Girls is a 1958 Austrian-West German musical film directed by Ernst Marischka and starring Karlheinz Böhm, Rudolf Schock and Magda Schneider. It is based on the operetta Das Dreimäderlhaus. The story had previously been made into the film Three Girls for Schubert in 1936.

The film's sets were designed by the art director Fritz Jüptner-Jonstorff.

Cast
 Karlheinz Böhm as Franz Schubert
 Rudolf Schock as Franz von Schober
 Magda Schneider as Frau Tschöll
 Gustav Knuth as Christian Tschöll
 Johanna Matz as Hannerl
 Richard Romanowsky as Diabelli
 Erich Kunz as Johann Mayrhofer
 Helga Neuner as Heiderl
 Gerda Siegl as Hederl
 Eberhard Wächter as J.M. Vogl - Hofopernsänger
 Helmuth Lohner as Moritz von Schwind
 Albert Rueprecht as Leopold Kupelwieser
 Lotte Lang as Kathi
 Else Rambausek as Mrs. Prametzberger
 Edith Elmay as Franzi Seidl
 Daniela Sigell
 Brigitte Jonak
 Ewald Balser as Ludwig van Beethoven
 Liselotte Bav as Therese Pichler

See also
 The House of Three Girls (1918)
 Blossom Time (1934)
 Three Girls for Schubert (1936)

References

Bibliography 
 Bock, Hans-Michael & Bergfelder, Tim. The Concise CineGraph. Encyclopedia of German Cinema. Berghahn Books, 2009.

External links 
 

1958 films
1950s historical musical films
Austrian historical musical films
German historical musical films
West German films
1950s German-language films
Films directed by Ernst Marischka
Films set in the 1820s
Films set in Vienna
Biographical films about musicians
Films about composers
Films about classical music and musicians
Films based on Austrian novels
Films based on adaptations
Films based on operettas
Remakes of German films
Sound film remakes of silent films
Cultural depictions of Franz Schubert
Depictions of Ludwig van Beethoven on film
UFA GmbH films
Films set in the Austrian Empire
1950s German films